Centre Market Square Historic District is a historic district in Wheeling, West Virginia, listed on the National Register of Historic Places.

The district includes 181 contributing buildings in a variety of popular architectural styles dating from as early as about 1850.  The district encompasses the area of Wheeling focused on the separately listed Center Wheeling Market.  Notable buildings include the Second Presbyterian Church (1850), St. Alphonsus Church and School (1875, 1887), Mary A. Reed Building (c. 1885), Shaefer Building (1887), Bellinger Building (c. 1885), Schmeichel Building (c. 1900), Zink House (c. 1878), Lotz Building (c. 1873), Thoner House (c. 1877), Wheeling Public Library (1911), German Evangelical Lutheran Zion's Church (c. 1850, now Oglebay Institute-Towngate Theatre), 2333 Eoff Street (c. 1870–1900), 2227 Eoff Street (c. 1900–1915), 2330 Chapline Street (c. 1876), 2318 Chapline Street (c. 1901), townhouses on Chapline Street, (c. 1870s), 2325 Chapline Street, 2241 Chapline Street, 2233 Chapline Street, the Hellenic Orithodox Church of St. John the Divine (c. 1949–1951), St. John's United Church of Christ (c. 1907–1908), Michel Building (c. 1860–1870), Wheeling Fire Company-Hook and Ladder #6 (late 1870s-1880s), and the "Iron Building" (c. 1867).

It was listed on the National Register in 1984, with a boundary increase in 1987.

References

External links

National Register of Historic Places in Wheeling, West Virginia
Historic districts in Wheeling, West Virginia
Greek Revival architecture in West Virginia
Victorian architecture in West Virginia
Italianate architecture in West Virginia
Historic American Buildings Survey in West Virginia
Historic districts on the National Register of Historic Places in West Virginia